Christopher John England (born August 19, 1976) is an American politician and the former chair of the Alabama Democratic Party. England was the first black chairman of either major political party in the history of the state of Alabama.

Early life and education
England was born on August 19, 1976. His father, John H. England Jr., is a judge of the 6th Circuit Court in Alabama, former Tuscaloosa City Council member, and served as a justice on the Alabama Supreme Court from 1999 to 2000. He received his Bachelor of Arts from Howard University and his Juris Doctor from the University of Alabama. He is a member of the Alpha Phi Alpha fraternity and has served on the board of directors of the Police Athletic League and PRIDE.

Career
England is a member of the Alabama House of Representatives, representing the 70th District unopposed since 2006. In December 2018, England was elected caucus chair of the House Democratic Caucus.
England also serves as Associate City Attorney in the City of Tuscaloosa, handling Claims, Franchise Agreements, and Tax Issues.

References

1976 births
20th-century African-American people
21st-century African-American politicians
21st-century American politicians
African-American state legislators in Alabama
Alabama Democratic Party chairs
Democratic Party members of the Alabama House of Representatives
Living people
Politicians from Tuscaloosa, Alabama